Xisha ("Western Sands") is the Chinese name for the Hoàng Sa or Paracel Islands.

It may also refer to:

 Xisha (Yangtze), one of the former islands which developed into Chongming

See also
 Xiasha (disambiguation)